The Battle of Dasman Palace ( maʿraka Qaṣr Dasmān), also called the Battle of Dasman, was a battle between the Kuwaiti and Iraqi forces during the Iraqi invasion of Kuwait on 2 August 1990.

Battle 
On 2 August 1990, shortly after 00:00 local time, Iraq invaded Kuwait. The attack on Dasman Palace, the residence of the Emir of Kuwait, by Iraqi special forces commenced sometime between 04:00 and 06:00; these forces have been variously reported as helicopter airborne troops, or as infiltrators in civilian clothes. The Iraqi forces were reinforced through the battle by the arrival of further troops, notably elements of the Republican Guard "Hammurabi" Division that had passed to the east of Al Jahra, using Highway 80 to attack into Kuwait City.

Fighting was fierce, especially around midday, but ended around 14:00 with the Iraqis taking control of the palace. They were thwarted in their aim of capturing the Emir and his advisors, who had relocated to General Headquarters before the assault began. Among the casualties was the Emir's younger brother, Fahd Al-Ahmad, who was killed as he arrived to defend the palace.

References

See also 
 The Battle of the Bridges

1990 in Kuwait
Dasman Palace
History of Kuwait
August 1990 events in Asia